Twilight: Los Angeles, 1992 is a one-woman play written and originally performed by Anna Deavere Smith, an American actress, playwright and professor. It is about the 1992 Los Angeles Uprising.

The original Broadway production opened at the Cort Theatre in New York City on April 17, 1994, and ran for 72 performances. The play is composed of a series of monologues by real people connected directly and indirectly to the uprising. Smith chose the texts of the monologues and the subjects from interviews that she had conducted with more than 300 individuals in the process of researching the play. It is considered an example of the genre of verbatim theatre. The play was nominated in 1994 for a Tony Award for Best Play. It won the Drama Desk Award for Outstanding One-Person Show, Smith's second such honor in two years.

Process
Smith interviewed some 300 people to gain opinions and viewpoints about the events related to the 1992 riots. From these interviews, she chose numerous subjects to feature as characters of the play, including such public officials as LAPD chief Daryl Gates and Congresswoman Maxine Waters; a nameless juror on the Rodney King police trial, which acquittal of police officers in his attack was a catalyst for the riots; various victims and instigators of violence in South Central, including white truck driver Reginald Denny, who was beaten; and residents of greater Los Angeles with their own view of the events, including singer Jessye Norman and actor Charlton Heston. She memorized and delivered words in Korean to portray a Korean-American woman whose business had been burned.

Twilight which takes its name from Twilight Bey, the Watts Gang Truce Activist, is a direct successor to Smith's previous play, Fires in the Mirror (1992). It was also a one-woman play composed of monologues taken from interview transcripts. It was related to the Crown Heights riot of 1991 in Brooklyn, New York. Both plays are considered trailblazers in a genre that has become known as verbatim theatre.

Awards and nominations
Twilight was nominated for the 1994 Tony Award for Best Play, losing to Angels in America: Perestroika. Smith was nominated for the Tony Award for Best Actress in a Play, losing to Diana Rigg in Medea.

It won the Drama Desk Award for Outstanding One-Person Show, Smith's second such honor in two years.

Film
Smith recreated her roles in a filmed production entitled Twilight: Los Angeles (2000), directed by Marc Levin. It was aired on the PBS series Stage on Screen and in some theaters.

Legacy
In April 2012 Smith returned to Los Angeles to take part in a "community conversation" marking the 20th-anniversary of the riot. It was sponsored by the nonprofit organization Facing History and Ourselves, and was to be held at Robert F. Kennedy Community High School's Cocoanut Grove Theater at 701 S. Catalina Street.

Katselas Theatre Company mounted a production of Twilight at the Skylight Theater, with a "multiethnic cast of 25 performing many of the characters originally all portrayed by Smith".

Watts Village Theater Company launched "Riot/Rebellion," a multi-year project exploring three episodes of L.A. civil unrest: the 1965 Watts uprising, "the 1992 conflagration and the 1943 Zoot Suit riots, in which non-Latino white U.S. servicemen brawled with Mexican Americans and African Americans."

Awards and nominations

Original Broadway production

2021 Off-Broadway revival

References

External links

'Twilight: Los Angeles 1992 on PBS

Plays by Anna Deavere Smith
1994 plays
Plays set in Los Angeles
Plays about race and ethnicity
Plays based on actual events
Plays for one performer
Fiction set in 1992